Sally Schantz is an American former figure skater.  She competed in ice dance with Stanley Urban.  Together, they were the 1963 U.S. Champions.

Schantz was from Indianapolis, Indiana.  She represented the Skating Club of Boston while skating with Urban, who was attending Boston College at the time.

Schantz and Urban were unable to defend their title in 1964 because Urban was injured.  Schantz decided to turn professional at that time to take a coaching position.  She was the coach of an early precision skating team at St. Lawrence University, the "Larriettes".  Urban later returned to compete with a different partner.

Results

Ice Dance
(with Edward H. Smith, Jr.)

(with Stanley Urban)

References

American female ice dancers
Boston College people
St. Lawrence University faculty
Living people
Year of birth missing (living people)
American women academics
21st-century American women